The Miss Hawaii USA competition, previously known as Miss Hawaii Universe, is a beauty pageant that selects the representative for the state of Hawaii in the Miss USA pageant.

Savannah Gankiewicz of Wailea was crowned Miss Hawaii USA 2023 on January 15, 2023 at Hawaii Convention Center in Honolulu. She will represent Hawaii for the title of Miss USA 2023.

History
Hawaii is the most recent state to participate in Miss USA, first competing in 1962. Prior to being admitted to full statehood in 1959, it sent delegates to Miss Universe. Despite the late start, it has been one of the most successful: Hawaii's first Miss Hawaii USA, Macel Wilson, won the Miss USA title. Four Miss USA winners came from Hawaii, one of four states with four titles (only second to Texas and California). Though many Miss USA winners and semifinalists came from Hawaii, relatively few have placed as runners-up. Two previously competed at Miss Teen USA. Kelly Hu, Miss Teen USA 1985, became the first Miss Teen USA winner to win a Miss title, in 1993.

Many Miss Hawaii USA titleholders competed at a number of international pageants. Similar to Miss South Carolina USA, there was one Miss Hawaii USA that competed at Miss World. Another one competed at Miss International. Four of the winners competed at Miss Universe, after winning Miss USA. Six titleholders represented the United States or Hawaii at major international pageants, with Miss Hawaii USA 1997, Brook Lee, winning the title of Miss USA 1997 and capturing the crown of Miss Universe 1997, one of only 8 Miss USA winners to become Miss Universe in the history of the pageant.

Gallery of titleholders

Results summary

Placements
Miss USAs: Macel Wilson (1962), Tanya Wilson (1972), Judi Andersen (1978), Brook Lee (1997)
1st runner-up: Chelsea Hardin (2016)
2nd runner-up: Blanche Leialoha Maa (1979)
4th runner-up: Teri Ann Linn (1981)
Top 6: Kelly Hu (1993)
Top 8/10/11/12: Lois Wise (1975), Cely De Castro (1977), Vanessa Dubois (1982), Tina Machado (1985), Kym Digman (1991), Nadine Tanega (1994), Alicia Michioka (2003), Chanel Wise (2007), Angela Byrd (2011), Emma Wo (2015), Samantha Neyland (2020)
Top 15:  Elithe Aguiar (1965), Judith Wolski (1966), Carol Seymour (1968), Stephanie Quintana (1969), Lacie Choy (2019)

Hawaii holds a record of 24 placements at Miss USA.

Awards
Miss Congeniality: Ku'ualoha Taylor (1996), Michelle Kaplan (2000)
Miss Photogenic: Kelly Hu (1993)
Style Award: Lynn Vesnefski (1995)

Winners 
Color key

Notes to table

References

External links
 Miss Hawaii USA official webpage

Hawaii
Hawaii culture
Women in Hawaii
Recurring events established in 1952
1952 establishments in Hawaii
Annual events in Hawaii